Herman Andersson  (15 March 1869 - 3 October 1938) was a Swedish farmer and politician. He represented the Farmer's League (Centre Party) in the lower house of the Swedish bicameral parliament from 1901 until his death in 1938.

References

Members of the Riksdag from the Centre Party (Sweden)
1869 births
1938 deaths
Members of the Andra kammaren